Gino J. Cavallini (born November 24, 1962) is a Canadian former professional ice hockey forward. He played in the National Hockey League with the Calgary Flames, St. Louis Blues, and Quebec Nordiques between 1985 and 1993. He is the brother of the NHL hockey player Paul Cavallini.

Playing career
Cavallini played one year for the St. Michael's Buzzers, a Junior hockey team in the Ontario Hockey Association (now part of the Ontario Provincial Junior A Hockey League). Following his short stint with the Buzzers, Cavallini was offered a scholarship to play college hockey for the Bowling Green State University Falcons.  He remained with the Falcons for two years (1982–1984).  He is noted for scoring the game-winning goal in the 1984 NCAA Championship game, 7:11 into the fourth overtime.  At 97 minutes and 11 seconds, it stands today as one of the longest games in Division I hockey history.

Following his two seasons at Bowling Green, the Calgary Flames signed Cavallini as a free agent during the 1984–85 season. He would go on to score six goals in 27 games that season.

Cavallini played parts of two seasons with the Flames, alternating between the NHL and minor AHL team, the Moncton Golden Flames. Following his second professional season, he was traded to the St. Louis Blues as part of a multi-player deal (Cavallini, Ed Beers and Charlie Bourgeois for Joey Mullen, Terry Johnson and Rik Wilson). While with the Blues, Cavallini served as the alternate captain to Brian Sutter. As part of the Ron Caron-managed franchise from 1986–1992, Cavallini helped provide leadership, enthusiasm, and disciplined strength on the ice. During those seasons, the Blues re-established themselves as a competitive force in the Norris Division making the playoffs each year. During his playing seasons with the Blues, Cavallini's brother, defenseman Paul also joined the squad.

Referred to locally as "The Tank", Cavallini's grit on the ice was evident throughout his NHL seasons with Calgary (54 games), St. Louis (454 games), and later with the Quebec Nordiques (85 games). In total he played 593 regular-season games, scoring 114 goals and 159 assists for 273 points and collecting 507 penalty minutes.  He also played in 74 playoff games, scoring 14 goals and 19 assists for 33 points and collecting 66 penalty minutes. From 1986–1990, Cavallini had his best NHL seasons, recording more than 30 points per season and scoring 20 goals in the 1988–89 season.

Cavallini left the NHL after the 1993 season, spending 3 seasons with the Milwaukee Admirals of the International Hockey League. His commitment to the game helped solidify Cavallini as a leader for the Admirals, with impressive stats scoring 139 goals and 248 points in 3 seasons. He then completed his career in Europe, playing primarily in Germany with EV Landshut and Austria with EC Villacher before retiring in the 2000–01 season.

Personal life
Cavallini's son, Aidan, played hockey at the University of Wisconsin. Aidan is married to goaltender Alex Cavallini.

Career statistics

Regular season and playoffs

References

External links
 

1962 births
Living people
Canadian people of Italian descent
Bolzano HC players
Bowling Green Falcons men's ice hockey players
Calgary Flames players
Canadian expatriate ice hockey players in Germany
Canadian ice hockey left wingers
EC VSV players
EHC Biel players
EV Landshut players
Milwaukee Admirals (IHL) players
Moncton Golden Flames players
NCAA men's ice hockey national champions
Quebec Nordiques players
St. Louis Blues players
Ice hockey people from Toronto
Undrafted National Hockey League players